Miss Teen Canada was a personality and beauty competition in Canada for women aged 14 to 17. The event started in 1969 and was televised on CTV. The pageant was named Miss Teenage Canada for its first three years and was originally sponsored by A&W Drive-Ins. Cleo Productions, who owned the event for most of its years, closed the contest down in 1990 due to financial concerns.

Several teen pageants exist again in Canada today, the biggest of which is Miss Teenage Canada, run by Michelle Weswaldi, Miss World Canada 1996.  The winner of Miss Teenage Canada goes on to compete at Miss Teen Universe.

Winners
The following is a complete list of winners of the Miss Teen Canada competition (1969–1992):

Hosts
Pierre Lalonde 
Peter Pringle
Alex Trebek

References 

Beauty pageants in Canada
Canadian awards
Youth events
Youth in Canada
1969 establishments in Canada
Recurring events established in 1969
Beauty pageants for youth